Just Imagine is a 1930 American pre-Code science fiction musical-comedy film, directed by David Butler. The film is known for its art direction and special effects in its portrayal of New York City in an imagined 1980. Just Imagine stars El Brendel, Maureen O'Sullivan, John Garrick and Marjorie White. The "man from 1930" was played by El Brendel, an ethnic vaudeville comedian of a forgotten type: the Swedish immigrant.

The film starts with a preamble showing life in 1880, where the people believed themselves the "last word in speed". It switches to 1930, with the streets crowded with automobiles and lined with electric lights and telephone wires. It then switches to 1980, where the tenement houses have morphed into 250-story buildings, connected by suspension bridges and multi-lane elevated roads.

Plot
In 1980, J-21 (John Garrick) sets his aircraft on "hover" mode in New York, lands and converses with the beautiful LN-18 (Maureen O'Sullivan). He describes how the marriage tribunal had refused to consider J-21's marital filing and applications, and LN-18 is going to be forced to marry the conceited and mean MT-3 (Kenneth Thomson). J-21 plans to visit LN-18 that night.

RT-42 (Frank Albertson) tries to cheer him up by taking him to see a horde of surgeons experimentally revive a man from 1930, who was struck by lightning while playing golf, and was killed. The man (originally named Peterson now is called Single O) is taken in hand by RT-42 and J-21, where it is revealed that aircraft have replaced cars, numbers have replaced names, pills have replaced food and liquor, and the only legal babies come from vending machines. That night, LN-18 feigns a headache, and her father and the despicable MT-3 decide to go to "the show" without her. The second they are gone, RT-42 and J-21 appear and woo D-6 and LN-18 respectively. MT-3 and LN-18's father return quite early, as MT-3 was highly suspicious, and RT-42 and J-21 hide. However, the game is foiled by the moronic Single O (El Brendel), the man from 1930, becoming addicted to pill-highballs, getting drunk, and trying to get some more pill-highballs from J-21.

J-21 is depressed, but is contacted by Z-4, the scientist. He is told that Z-4 (Hobart Bosworth) has built a "rocket plane" that can carry three men to Mars. After a farewell party where J-21 works, on the Pegasus, a dirigible they call an "air-liner," the rocket blasts off, carrying J-21, RT-42 and Single O, who has stowed away for the synthetic rum. Landing on Mars, they are received by the Queen, Looloo and the King, Loko. That night, Looloo and Loko take them to see a "show," a Martian opera, where a horde of trained Martian ourang-outangs dance about. They are suddenly attacked by Booboo and Boko, the evil twins (everyone on Mars is a twin) of the King and Queen. They escape and return to Earth, and as one of the first men on another planet, J-21 is permitted to marry LN-18. Finally, Single O is reunited with his aged son, Axel.

Cast

Production

Art/cinematography
The massive, distinctive Art Deco city-scape, for which Just Imagine has come to be best remembered, was built in a former Army balloon hangar by a team of 205 technicians over a five-month period. The giant miniature cost $168,000 to build and was wired with 15,000 miniature lightbulbs (an additional 74 arc lights were used to light the city from above); other production credits include costumes by Alice O'Neil, Sophie Wachner, and Dolly Tree.

Special effects
The sequence in which the El Brendel character is revived from the dead features the first screen appearance of the spectacular electrical equipment assembled by Kenneth Strickfaden, seen again and more famously in James Whale's Frankenstein (1931). Over 50 special effects shots combining previously photographed backgrounds with live foreground action were accomplished using the Dunning Process. Rear projection technology of the scale and quality required was not available at the time.

The set design in the form of glass pictures and miniatures was done by Stephen Goosson, Ralph Hammeras, SPFX-guru Willis O'Brien, and Marcel Delgado (all uncredited).

Music
Of the DeSylva, Brown and Henderson songs introduced in the film, "Never Swat a Fly" was covered as the classic 1930 recording by McKinney's Cotton Pickers, the 1967 revival by Jim Kweskin & The Jug Band, and more recent recordings by Doc Cheatham among others.

Reception
Mordaunt Hall called Just Imagine, "clever", "highly imaginative" and "intriguing" and praised the costumes and set design. This expensive film was a one-time-only novelty stunt, bolstered by the short-lived popularity of El Brendel. Wonder Stories "cordially recommended" the film, saying it "shows us many of the wonders that our science fiction authors have been writing about".

Although a box-office flop, however, it was eventually able to make back some of its production costs in the studio shopping out clips of the futuristic sets for other films of the period. Clips of the cityscape from this movie were later used in the Universal serials Flash Gordon and Buck Rogers;  the mock-up Mars spaceship was reused in the former as Dr. Zarkov's spaceship. Also seen in the first Flash Gordon serial are the strange hand-weapons carried by J21 and RT42 on Mars, which are held under rather than over the fist, and re-used footage of dancing girls cavorting about and on a Martian idol with moving arms.

By the time Just Imagine was released, movie musicals had greatly declined in popularity. As a result, major American studios would not back another big budget science fiction film until 1951. There was to be only one other American science-fiction musical in that period, It's Great to Be Alive (1933), which failed at the box-office. Film serials were an exception to this general trend, however.

The first Flash Gordon serial from 1936 had an unusually large budget for a serial of the time, and Gene Autry's The Phantom Empire from 1935 can loosely be considered a science fiction musical serial.

Awards
Just Imagine was nominated for an Academy Award for Best Art Direction by Stephen Goosson and Ralph Hammeras. It is notable as the first film of the science fiction genre to be nominated for an Oscar.

See also

List of films set on Mars

References

Notes

Bibliography

 Altman, Rick. The American Film Musical. Bloomington Indiana: Indiana University Press, 1987. .
 Kreuger, Miles ed. The Movie Musical from Vitaphone to 42nd Street as Reported in a Great Fan Magazine. New York: Dover Publications, 1974. .

External links

 
 
 
 

1930 films
1930 musical comedy films
1930s science fiction comedy films
American aviation films
American science fiction comedy films
American musical comedy films
1930s English-language films
Films directed by David Butler
Fox Film films
American black-and-white films
Films set in the 1880s
Films set in 1930
Films set in 1980
Science fiction musical films
Films set in the future
Mars in film
American musical fantasy films
1930s American films